A light chain is the small polypeptide subunit of a protein complex.

More specifically, it can refer to:
 Immunoglobulin light chain
 Ferritin light chain
 Myosin light chain
 Kinesin light chain
 Dynein light chain

Light chain may also refer to:
Mail (armour)